Robert McDonagh or Bob McDonagh may refer to:

 Bob McDonagh (1924–2015), Irish diplomat
 Bobby McDonagh (born 1954), Irish diplomat, son of Bob McDonagh
 Bob McDonagh (rugby league) ( 1950s), Australian rugby league player with the Sydney Roosters